Ted Goodwin (born 4 August 1951) is an Australian former professional rugby league footballer in the NSWRL competition. Goodwin played for the St George Dragons, Newtown Jets and Western Suburbs Magpies as well as representing for Country and New South Wales and Australia.

Career
Born in Crows Nest, Sydney to New Zealand immigrants. His father was an Anglo-New Zealander and his mother was a Māori. A Dapto High School junior, Goodwin had a long and eventful club career. He signed with St George Dragons in 1972 after coming to talent scouts' attention when representing for Country from the Dapto club. Wildly unpredictable but extraordinarily gifted player, Ted Goodwin played seven seasons for the St George Dragons between 1972-1978, the high point probably being a part of the winning 1977 Grand Final team.

St George Dragons 1972-1978
A hugely popular player and a St George 'favorite son', Goodwin played in three first grade Grand Finals with St George: the 1975 loss to Eastern Suburbs, the 1977 9–9 draw with Parramatta and the subsequent replay, won by St George, 22–0. In the drawn 1977 match he scored one of the best tries ever seen in a Grand Final when he regathered the ball after a great chip and chase and grounded it just before the dead-ball line, knocking himself unconscious in the process when his face smacked the hard Sydney Cricket Ground surface. He took no further part in the match but backed up the following week to kick six goals and a field-goal in the replay. Ted was nicknamed 'Lord Ted' by the late St George legend Len Kelly in the early 1970s and the Goodwin is still remembered as 'Lord Ted' today.

1979-1982
Goodwin played his final season with the St George Dragons in 1978, had a one season stay at Newtown Jets in 1979 and resurrected his career as a tough, dynamic forward with the Roy Masters coached Western Suburbs Magpies sides of 1980-1982. He was later named in the Western Suburbs Magpies Team of the Eighties. He finished his playing days in New South Wales Country Rugby League with stints as captain-coach at Parkes and Forbes in Group 11 and also with the Willagee Bears in 1989-90 in the Western Australian Rugby League competition.

Representative career
Having earlier represented for Country from Dapto, Goodwin made eight state appearances for New South Wales during his St George years. In 1972 he made his national representative debut as a reserve in the second Test against New Zealand. He was selected on the 1973 Kangaroo tour led by his club captain Graeme Langlands. Goodwin appeared in six minor tour matches and on the wing in a Test match against Great Britain and in two against France. He scored seven tries on the tour, two in the first French Test. He is listed on the Australian Players Register as Kangaroo No.463.

Post-playing
Goodwin went on to become a graded referee in Perth and up until 2001 held a position as Development Officer with the Western Australian Rugby League. He was instrumental in schools development of the code in Western Australia in the 1990s. In 2002 he was a  referee for junior rugby league in Sydney's Sutherland Shire refereeing the 13B's Grand Final at Endeavour Field.

Sons
Three of Goodwin's four sons played first grade rugby league in Australia - Luke (Penrith Panthers, Canterbury Bulldogs, Western Reds, Western Suburbs Magpies); Bronx (Canberra Raiders, Cronulla Sharks, St George Illawarra Dragons) and Bryson  (Cronulla Sharks, Canterbury Bulldogs, South Sydney Rabbitohs).

Sources
 Andrews, Malcolm (2006) The ABC of Rugby League Austn Broadcasting Corpn, Sydney
 Whiticker, Alan & Hudson, Glen (2006) The Encyclopedia of Rugby League Players, Gavin Allen Publishing, Sydney

References

External links
Ted Goodwin at St. George
Ted Goodwin at eraofthebiff.com

1951 births
Australian rugby league players
Australian rugby league referees
Australian people of Māori descent
Australia national rugby league team players
St. George Dragons players
New South Wales rugby league team players
New Zealand Māori rugby league players
Newtown Jets players
Western Suburbs Magpies players
Rugby league centres
Living people
Rugby league players from Sydney